Menace to Society is the second studio album by Los Angeles metal band Lizzy Borden.

Released in 1986 by Metal Blade Records, this would become a success for the band appearing on the Billboard 200 for 10 weeks and peaking at 144. The album was re-released in 2002 with 4 bonus tracks, and again on vinyl in 2018.

Track listing

Personnel
Lizzy Borden
Lizzy Borden - vocals
Gene Allen - guitars
Alex Nelson - guitars, backing vocals
Mike Davis - bass
Joey Scott Harges - drums

Production
Jim Faraci - producer, engineer
Brian Slagel - executive producer

Charts

References

1986 albums
Lizzy Borden (band) albums
Enigma Records albums
Metal Blade Records albums